Now Add Honey is a 2015 Australian comedy film written by Robyn Butler and directed by Wayne Hope. The film stars Butler, Lucy Fry, Portia de Rossi, Lucy Durack, Hamish Blake, Angus Sampson and Erik Thomson.

Butler was nominated for the AACTA Award for Best Actress in a Leading Role at the 5th AACTA Awards.

Cast

 Robyn Butler as Caroline Morgan
 Lucy Fry as Honey Halloway
 Portia de Rossi as Beth Halloway
 Lucy Durack as Katie Halloway
 Hamish Blake as Alex Kilstein 
 Erik Thomson as Richard Morgan
 Angus Sampson as Mick Croyston
 Ben Lawson as Joshua Redlich
 Robbie Magasiva as Sebastian Tasi 
 Philippa Coulthard as Clare Morgan
 David Field as Roger Gardam
 Lucinda Armstrong Hall as Harriet Morgan
 Ben Schumann as Liam
 Sandy Gore as Diane
 Luke McGregor as Charles
 Stephen Hall as Hotel Concierge
 Tim Potter as Eric
 Heidi Arena as Rhonda
 Dave Thornton as Detective Smith
 Emily Taheny as Detective Davis
 Marty Sheargold as Gavin
 Faustina Agolley as Sian

References

External links
 
 
 

2015 comedy films
2015 films
Australian comedy films
Films set in Melbourne
Films shot in Melbourne
2010s English-language films
Screen Australia films
Roadshow Entertainment films
2010s Australian films